The 2011–12 Connecticut Huskies men's basketball team represented the University of Connecticut in the 2011–2012 NCAA Division I basketball season. The Huskies were coached by Jim Calhoun and played their home games at the XL Center in Hartford, Connecticut, and on campus at the Harry A. Gampel Pavilion in Storrs, Connecticut. The Huskies were a member of the Big East Conference.

As punishment for prior recruiting violations, head coach Jim Calhoun served a three-game suspension, in UConn's first three Big East games (at South Florida, St. John's, at Seton Hall).  The team also lost one scholarship, reduced from 13 to 12, and is restricted in other recruiting activities.

On February 4, 2012, Calhoun announced he would take an indefinite medical break from coaching as a result of spinal stenosis. Associate head coach George Blaney said he would be managing the team during Calhoun's absence.

Roster

Schedule 

|-
!colspan=9| Exhibition

|- 
!colspan=9| Regular Season

 

 

|-
!colspan=12| 2012 Big East tournament
   

   
|-
!colspan=9| 2012 NCAA tournament

Rankings

Notes

UConn Huskies men's basketball seasons
Connecticut
Connecticut
2011 in sports in Connecticut
2012 in sports in Connecticut